Biosatellite 2, also known as Biosat 2 or Biosatellite B, was the second mission in NASA's Biosatellite program for biological research. It was launched on September 7, 1967, by a Delta G rocket from Cape Canaveral Air Force Station in Florida.

Biosatellite 2 carried 13 biological experiments involving insects, frog eggs, plants and microorganisms. The mission was ended early because of a tropical storm threat in the recovery area and communication problems between the capsule and ground stations. The main objective of the mission was to determine if the radiation sensitivity of living organisms in space is greater or less than on land, for which disposed of a radiation source in front of the capsule.

The satellite is currently the property of the National Air and Space Museum, reference number A19731629000. It is currently on loan to the Museum of Science and Industry, Chicago.

Experiments
 Effects of Weightlessness on Wheat Seedling Morphogenesis and Histochemistry
 Growth Physiology of the Wheat Seedling in Space
 Biochemical Changes in the Developing Wheat Seedling in a Weightless State
 Effect of Sub-gravity on the Dividing Egg of Rana Pipiens
 Mutational Response of Habrobracon
 Liminal Angle of a Plagiogeotropic Organ
 Effects of Radiation and Weightlessness on Tribolium Pupae
 Effects of Weightlessness on Radiation Induced Somatic Dam. in Drosophila Larvae
 Effects of Space on Radiation-Induced Damage to Reproductive Cells of Drosophila Adults and Pupae
 Genetic and Cytologic Studies of Tradescantia Irradiated During Flight
 Combined Effects of Weightlessness and Radiation on Inact.+ Mutation in Neurospora
 Space Flight Effects + Gamma Radiation Interaction on Growth + Induc.of Bacteria
 Effect of Weightlessness on Amoeba, Pelomyxa Carolinensis
Effects of Weightlessness on the Nutrition and Growth of Pelomyxa carolinensis

See also
 Biosatellite 1
 Biosatellite 3
 Bion program

References

External links
 NASA Facts Biosatellite II. Scribd

1967 in spaceflight
Biosatellites
Spacecraft launched by Delta rockets